Grewia kakothamnos is a species of flowering plant in the family Malvaceae, found from southern Ethiopia to Tanzania. Its flowers are white to pale lilac, and its two or four-lobed fruit are orange when ripe, and edible in a famine situation. Grewia kakothamnos is particularly enjoyed as a forage by domestic goats (Capra aegagrus hircus), which will even eat the dead fallen leaves during the dry season.

References

kakothamnos
Flora of Ethiopia
Flora of Somalia
Flora of East Tropical Africa
Plants described in 1904